River's End: California's Latest Water War is a 2021 American documentary film written and directed by Jacob Morrison. It follows the competition over California's limited water resources amid worsening droughts, as well as the decline of freshwater ecosystems in the California Delta. The documentary draws parallels to the California water wars featured in the 1974 film Chinatown.

The film had its world premiere at the 2021 Wild & Scenic Film Festival on January 14, 2021, where it won the Jury Award and People's Choice Award. It then played at the International Wildlife Film Festival where it won its category. It was released on video on demand by Giant Pictures on November 2, 2021. It received acclaim from critics, with praise for its story, interviews, cinematography, animation, and subject matter.

Plot 

The film explores the struggle over California's limited freshwater resources during recent periods of drought, with particular focus on the expansion of almond groves in the Westlands Water District. The film explores the connection between increased water use for agriculture, and the decline of freshwater ecosystems in the Sacramento–San Joaquin River Delta. The documentary also draws parallels between the construction of the Los Angeles Aqueduct during the historic California water wars, and the now proposed conveyance tunnels in the Sacramento-San Joaquin River Delta.

Cast 

 Narrated by DeLanna Studi
 Subjects include (but are not limited to):
 Peter Gleick
 Bettina Boxall
 Richard White (historian)
 Jared Huffman
 Tom McClintock
 George Miller (California politician)

Reception 

The film received positive reviews from critics. Film Threat gave the film a 9/10 rating, writing that River's End "…effectively uses beautiful scenic photography, well-executed interviews, archival footage, and helpful animation." New Scientist also praised the film, stating that "River’s End provides a thorough overview of California’s water issues and the need to achieve a sustainable water supply." Counterpunch wrote, " I urge you to see this timely, very important, indeed, great film: River’s End." National Observer (Canada) gave the film a positive review, writing, "This is a documentary with a bite... anybody who buys produce from California, basically, most of us, should be interested." The film was included in several end-of-year lists as one of the best environmental films of 2021.

References 

2021 documentary films
2021 films
2020s English-language films